The Siemens SP90G is a German electric motor for powering electric aircraft, designed and produced by Siemens of Erlangen.

Design and development
The SP90G is a brushless design producing , with an outrunner coil. The design uses a planetary gear mechanical gearbox reduction drive.

Specifications (SP90G)

See also

References

Aircraft electric engines